Samit Gohel (born 13 September 1990) is an Indian first-class cricketer who plays for Tripura.

In the quarter-final match of the 2016–17 Ranji Trophy against Odisha, Gohel scored 359 not out, the highest total for someone carrying their bat in first-class cricket. His innings was the highest individual score in first-class cricket during the 2010s, and is the highest by an Indian in first-class cricket since M. V. Sridhar's knock of 366 in 1994.

He made his List A debut for Gujarat in the 2016–17 Vijay Hazare Trophy on 28 February 2017. He made his Twenty20 debut on 4 November 2021, for Tripura in the 2021–22 Syed Mushtaq Ali Trophy.

See also
 List of Ranji Trophy triple centuries

References

External links
 

1990 births
Living people
Indian cricketers
Gujarat cricketers
India Blue cricketers
People from Anand district